, also translated as The Counterfeiter, is a Japanese novella by Yasushi Inoue first published in 1951.

Plot
In early 1951, an art journalist receives an invitation for the 13th death anniversary of famous painter Keigaku Ōnuki. He remembers the assignment he received from Keigaku's relatives to write a biography on the artist 9 years ago, and decides to finally finish the project, which had come to a halt during the early post-war years. While studying Keigaku's diaries, he repeatedly reads of a friend by the name of Shinozaki, finally realising that Shinozaki is no other but Keigaku's former friend Hōsen Hara, who successfully copied Keigaku's art and sold it as originals.

The journalist recollects memories going back to 1943, when he met private owners of Keigaku's paintings and was repeatedly confronted with Hara's technically adept copies, and to 1945 and 1947, when he stayed in the village in Chūgoku Mountains, where Hara lived during his last years. Abandoned by his wife, Hara illegally experimented with gunpowder to create a firework of the colour of red chrysanthemums. The journalist contemplates on the fate of a man who, overshadowed by a famous artist friend, never received recognition for his own talent and faded into obscurity.

Publication history
Life of a Counterfeiter first appeared in the October 1951 edition of Shinchō magazine and was published in book form by Sōgensha the same year.

Reception
When published in 2015 in a new English translation, Eileen Battersby of The Irish Times saw in Life of a Counterfeiter "one of Inoue’s strongest stories", and the reviewer of Publishers Weekly a "masterly meditation on fate and obscurity".

Translations
Life of a Counterfeiter was published in English in 1965, translated by Leon Picon, and in 2015, translated by Michael Emmerich.

Bibliography

References

20th-century Japanese literature
Japanese novellas
Works by Japanese writers
Nonlinear narrative literature
1951 novels